Amourj is a town in the Hodh Ech Chargui Region of eastern Mauritania near the frontier of Mali.

In 2000 it had a population of 5,037.

References

Communes of Hodh Ech Chargui Region